Clarksville (Tong Ranch) is an unincorporated community in El Dorado County, California.

A post office operated at Clarksville from 1855 to 1924 and from 1927 to 1934.

References

Unincorporated communities in California
Unincorporated communities in El Dorado County, California
Populated places established in 1855
1855 establishments in California